Trinity—Spadina was a federal electoral district in Ontario, Canada, that was represented in the House of Commons of Canada from 1988 to 2015.

It generally encompassed the western portion of Downtown Toronto.

Its federal Member of Parliament (MP) was Olivia Chow of the New Democratic Party. She defeated Tony Ianno of the Liberal Party of Canada in the January 23, 2006 election. On March 12, 2014, Chow resigned from her seat in order to run for the 2014 Toronto mayoral election, and the seat was won by Adam Vaughan, in a by-election. The riding has long been a battle ground between the NDP and the Liberals, with the Liberals recently winning both federally and provincially.

Major landmarks within the riding included the western portion of the University of Toronto, the CN Tower, Rogers Centre (formerly Skydome), Air Canada Centre, the Canadian Broadcasting Centre, 299 Queen Street West, the Toronto Eaton Centre, the Metro Toronto Convention Centre, Toronto City Hall, Kensington Market, Chinatown, Christie Pits, Trinity Bellwoods Park, the southern portion of Bay Street and Palmerston Boulevard.

The riding contained Toronto's Chinatown, Koreatown, Little Italy, and Little Portugal. The northern section of the riding was the Annex district, while the eastern edge contained part of the University of Toronto and thousands of students.

Demographics
According to the Canada 2011 Census 
Average household income (2010): $86,895   
Median household income (2010): $60,659  
Median income (2010): $34,761 
Unemployment:    7.3% 
Language, mother tongue (2011): English 61.2%, Chinese 13.0%, Portuguese 4.4%, French 2.8%, Spanish 2.1%, Italian 1.8%, Korean 1.4%, Arabic 1.4% 
Religion (2011): Christian 42.9% (Catholic 24.4%, Anglican 3.6%, Christian Orthodox 2.5%, United Church 2.5%, Presbyterian 1.3%, Other 8.3%), Muslim 4.2%, Jewish 4.1%, Buddhist 3.4%, Hindu 1.8%, No religion 42.5%. 
Ethnic groups (2011): White 61.8%, Chinese 16.0%, South Asian 5.1%, Black 3.6%, Korean 1.8%, Filipino 1.8%, Latin American 1.7%, Southeast Asian 1.7%, Arab 1.6%, West Asian 1.1%

Geography

It consists of the Toronto Islands and the part of the City of Toronto bounded on the south by Toronto Harbour, and on the west, north and east by a line drawn from the harbour north on Spencer Avenue, east along the Gardiner Expressway, north on Dufferin, east on Queen Street West, southeast along the Canadian Pacific Railway line, north along Dovercourt Road, east along Dundas Street West, north along Ossington Avenue, east along the Canadian Pacific Railway situated north of Dupont Street, south along Avenue Road and Queens Park Crescent West, east along College Street and south along Yonge Street to the Harbour.

These borders were somewhat changed in the 2004 redistribution.  The northwestern corner, a somewhat pro-NDP area was lost to Davenport.  A large, but mostly business area of Toronto Centre—Rosedale between University Avenue and Yonge St. was given to the riding.  This region tends to support the Liberals.  The Toronto Islands were also added to the riding from Toronto Centre—Rosedale. This area is very strongly NDP and has a highly activist population that provides many campaign workers for the New Democrats.

History
The riding was created in 1987 from Trinity and Spadina, and smaller parts of Toronto Centre—Rosedale and Parkdale—High Park.

It consisted initially of the part of the City of Toronto bounded on the south by Toronto Harbour, on the east by Avenue Road, Queen's Park Crescent West, University Avenue and York Street, and on the west and north by a line drawn from the harbour north along Spencer Avenue, east along the Gardiner Expressway, north along Atlantic Avenue, southeast along the Canadian National Railway line, north along Dovercourt Road, east along Bloor Street West, north along Ossington Avenue, and east along the Canadian Pacific Railway line to Avenue Road.

In 2003, it was given its current boundaries as described above.

As per 2012 federal electoral boundaries redistribution and the 2013 representation order, Trinity—Spadina was dissolved following the conclusion of the next general election to be called after May 1, 2014. Most of the riding's territory, covering the area south of Dundas Street, became the new riding of Spadina—Fort York. The area north of Dundas and west of a line following Bay Street and Front Street became part of the new seat of University—Rosedale, while the area east of Bay Street and north of Front Street became part of Toronto Centre.

Members of Parliament

This riding has elected the following members of the House of Commons of Canada:

The seat became vacant on March 12, 2014, when Olivia Chow resigned in order to run in the Toronto mayoral election.

Election results

2014 by-election

2011 election

2008 election

Prior elections

See also
 List of Canadian federal electoral districts
 Past Canadian electoral districts

References

Notes

External links
Riding history from the Library of Parliament
 2008 results from Elections Canada
 2011 results from Elections Canada
 Campaign expense data from Elections Canada

Federal electoral districts of Toronto
Former federal electoral districts of Ontario
1987 establishments in Ontario
2013 disestablishments in Ontario